Lister or Lyster may refer to:

Names
 Lister (surname), also Lyster and Litster
 Lyster Kirkpatrick (1885–1921), Australian rules footballer
 Lyster Hoxie Dewey (1865–1944), American botanist
 Joseph Lister (1827–1912), British physician
 David "Dave" Lister, commonly referred to simply as Lister, is a fictional character from the British science fiction situation comedy Red Dwarf, portrayed by Craig Charles

Places
 Lister, British Columbia, Canada, a small community
 Lyster, Quebec, Canada, a municipality 
 Lyster Lake (Estrie, Canada), Estrie, in Quebec, Canada
 Lister Region, comprising the western parts of Vest-Agder county, Norway
 Luster, Norway, formerly called Lyster, a municipality
 Lister Hundred, part of Blekinge in Sweden
 Lister Park, a public park in Bradford, West Yorkshire, England
 Lister (river), North Rhine-Westphalia, Germany

Businesses
 Lister Cars, a British sports car manufacturer
 Lister Mills, a large former silk factory and landmark in the Manningham district of Bradford, West Yorkshire, England
 Lister Petter, manufacturer of industrial internal combustion engines in Gloucestershire, England
 R A Lister and Company, an engineering company in Gloucestershire, England, merged with Petters Limited to become Lister Petter

Other uses
 Lister Community School, in east London, England
 Lister District Court, in Vest-Agder, Norway
 Lister Hospital (disambiguation)
 Lister, title of a town tax appraiser (see tax assessment) in Vermont
 Lister v Romford Ice and Cold Storage Co Ltd
 Lister D, a stationary engine on petrol or petrol/paraffin (fuel) built between 1926-1965
 Corn lister, a type of planter (farm implement) no longer widely used

See also
 Lista, Vest-Agder, Norway

Lyster